Svenska Supercupen 2007, Swedish Super Cup 2007, was a football match played on 31 March 2007 between Allsvenskan 2006 champions IF Elfsborg and Svenska Cupen 2006 winners Helsingborgs IF. This was the first edition of a super cup in Sweden. Elfsborg won the game 1-0 after a goal from James Keene in the 55th minute. The attendance wasn't very positive for the new Swedish tournament, only 1,240 saw the match on Borås Arena.

Match facts

Supercupen
Supercupen seasons
Svenska Supercupen 2007
Svenska Supercupen 2007